Giannis Litsis (born 30 May 1989 in Athens, Greece) is a professional Greek footballer currently playing for Apollon Smyrni in the Football League, as a defender.

References
http://www.fcapollon.gr/cms/10018-Player-Info.aspx?playerid=hsKO%2fgYSaeo%3d&periodid=j7dn6-x6Bqo%253d
http://planetapollon.gr/?tag=γιάννης-λίτσης

1989 births
Living people
Association football defenders
Apollon Smyrnis F.C. players
Panachaiki F.C. players
Footballers from Athens
Greek footballers